Aprilia   is a city and comune (municipality) in the province of Latina, now incorporated in the conurbation of Rome, in the Lazio region of central Italy. It is the fifth most populous town in the region and the tenth largest by area.

Territory 

Although Aprilia is effectively part of the province of Latina, due to its northern positions strategically located between the Nettunense and the Pontina at the far north of the Pontinian province, Aprilia is commonly associated to Rome. It has been considered whether Aprilia should switch provinces to be included within the Rome metropolitan area.

History

In ancient times the territory of Aprilia was under the dominion of Ardea and Rome.

In modern age Aprilia was founded on April 25, 1936, during the Fascist government. The project of the land reclamation, wanted by Benito Mussolini, where the Duce proposed new areas for Italian citizens to live and work in not so far from the big cities. Aprilia was part of the project called 2PST by Concezio Petrucci, Mario (Mosè) Tufaroli, Emanuele Filiberto Paolini e Riccardo Silenzi. The area where the city has been built belonged to the Rome county, is the fourth in order of foundation after Littoria, Sabaudia e Pontinia.
The name of the city come from the Latin Venus Aprilia – "Fruitful Venus"

With a surface of 17,774 hectares and 71,150 inhabitants , the municipality comprises the city center and the following settlements: Agip, Bellavista, Buon Riposo, Caffarelli, Campo del Fico, Campo di Carne, Campoleone, Campoverde, Carano-Garibaldi, Carroceto, Casalazzara, Fossignano, Gattone, Genio Civile, Giannottola, Guardapasso, Isole, La Gogna, Montarelli, Pantanelle, Pian di Frasso, Rosatelli, Spaccasassi, Torre Bruna, Toscanini, Torre del Padiglione, Tufello, Vallelata, Valli.

In 1929, after repeated attempts, began the work of land reclamation in the area that attracted a significant number of people coming from Trentino, Veneto, from Friuli, and from Emilia Romagna.

Only then a stable population settled in living for a small part in the new urban center, most of them in rural houses.

Aprilia was an integral part of the reclamation Pontina including Littoria (then Latina), Sabaudia, Pontinia and Pomezia.

At its foundation, the Urban Center was composed of four main buildings: City, post office, church and casa del Fascio, to which were later added Cinema Littorio and the inn.

Things became critical with the advance of World War II and the beginning of the Battle of Rome.

In January 1944 Aprilia called "la fabbrica", "the factory" by the Allies, was reduced to a pile of rubble and the population took refuge in Campania and Calabria.

In the 1950s, Italians from North Africa colonies who built extensive vineyards to produce wines with Denominazione di origine controllata and some of the best grapes in Italy.

With the establishment of the Cassa per il Mezzogiorno and, subsequently, the Consortium for the area of industrial development in Lazio, the future of Aprilia changed completely: it went from agriculture to a consumer 'market-oriented agriculture, and new and more technically advanced farms emerged. This was the first step toward industrialization itself.

At the end of 1951 settled in Aprilia's first factory, the Simmenthal, which was followed by many other national and international workshops. The town changed its face and gave work to many workers. Aprilia currently houses about one hundred plants, including some major corporations.

On Aprili 26, 1996, Aprilia became the sister city of Mostardas, a town of Rio Grande do Sul, Brazil, where the national hero Menotti Garibaldi was born, and whose remains rest in Aprilia after some parts of the neighbouring town Velletri switched to Aprilia in the same year.

Geography

Frazioni
Agip, Bellavista, Buon Riposo, Caffarelli, Campo del Fico, Campo di Carne, Campoleone, Campoverde, Carano – Garibaldi, Carroceto, Casalazzara, Fossignano, Gattone, Genio Civile, Giannottola, Guardapasso, Isole, La Cogna, Montarelli, Pantanelle, Pian di Frasso, Rosatelli, Spaccasassi, Torre Bruna, Toscanini, Torre del Padiglione, Tufello, Vallelata, Valli.

Aprilia DOC
The Aprilia region is home to a  Denominazione di origine controllata DOC that is noted for its varietal wines from varieties such as Trebbiano, Merlot, Sangiovese and Abbuoto. Under DOC regulations, the wine must be labeled correctly for the grape variety to qualify for the DOC designation. Nearly 75% of the DOC production is centered around Trebbiano.

Additional DOC requirements include:
Merlot and Trebbiano grapes must be harvested to a yield no greater than 15 tonnes per hectare with the finished wine needing to attain a minimum alcohol level of at least 11%
Sangiovese have a maximum yield restriction of 14 t/ha with the finished wine needing at least 11.5% alcohol by volume.

Aprilia from post-war to today
The rebuilt Aprilia economy was based on small local trade and sheep grazing. Subsequently, the minefields were cleared, and the sowing of cereals and the breeding of working cattle went back. At the end of the conflicts, starting from the 1950s, the territory of Aprilia experienced a phenomenon of growth in economic and population terms. During this period, Italian refugees arrived from North Africa who planted vast vineyards for the production of controlled denomination of origin wines and table grapes among the best in Italy.

With the establishment of the Cassa per il Mezzogiorno and, subsequently, of the Consortium for the industrial development area of Lazio, the future of Aprilia changed totally: it went from consumer agriculture to market agriculture and new ones were created. technically more advanced farms. This was the first step towards true industrialization. At the end of 1951, the first industrial plant, Simmenthal, took up residence in the Aprilia area, followed by many other national and international factories. The town changed its face and offered work to numerous workers. Currently around 100 plants operate in Aprilia, including some important multinationals.

Since the 1950s, several cases of infiltration by members of organized crime, both from the 'Ndrangheta and the Camorra, have been active in Aprilia, active not only in illicit activities but also in construction-related activities.

Today the city center presents itself in a significantly different way. The current appearance is due to the demolition of the Casa del Fascio in the seventies, the reconstruction of the Town Hall, the partial modifications of all the other buildings, restored after the war and the recent reconstruction of the bell tower of the Church of S. Michele Arcangelo occurred in 1999.

On October 29, 2012, by decree of the President of the Republic, Aprilia was awarded the title of City.

Coat of Arms 
Aprilia Coat of Arms
The coat of arms represents a field of sky with five black swallows on the fly unfolded, in the formation of an inverted wedge.

Honors 

The City of Aprilia received an honor on February 8, 2001.

Aprilia was in fact the site of episodes of civil resistance.

Monuments and places of interest

Religious Architecture 
St. Michael's and Maria Goretti's Churches

The church was one of the first buildings built in the city, and was partially destroyed during the last world war. In 1952 the original dedication to St. Michael was added to St. Maria Goretti

St.Michael Archangel Statue
In the city centre of Aprilia, in the churchyard, stands the statue of the patron saint of the city "San Michele Arcangelo", on which the historical wounds caused by the battle between Italo-Germans and Allies are still visible during the last world conflict.

Civil Architecture

Mausoleum of the Garibaldi family Mausoleo della famiglia Garibaldi 

In the hamlet of Carano there is the mausoleum where the remains of seventeen members of the Garibaldi family]] rest.

In the family crypt is also buried Menotti Garibaldi, son of Anita and Giuseppe Garibaldi, who lived in that place for several years until his death in Rome in 1903.

On March 31, 2011 the tomb was profaned by some vandals.
However, once the sarcophagus and the wooden chest containing Menotti's remains were uncovered, the intruders were unable to remove anything.

Other

World War II – Monument to the Fallen 
In Piazza della Repubblica there is a work created by the artist Luigi Gheno on a project by the architect Marcello De Rossi. The bronze and concrete stele was inaugurated on May 1, 1960, erected in honor of the fallen of all wars.

Monument to the fallen of the Battle of Anzio 

The monument, an obelisk located in via Carroceto, was inaugurated on February 18, 2014 and commemorates the fallen allies of the Battle of Anzio who remained without burial.

The inauguration ceremony was attended by Roger Waters, former founder, singer and bassist of Pink Floyd, whose father (second lieutenant Eric Fletcher Waters) died during the landing, precisely on February 18, 1944, and whose remains have never been found.

For the first time Roger Waters visited Aprilia to see the exact place where his father lost his life, placing a wreath at the base of the monument.

The obelisk bears the Italian translation of some lines of a song composed by Roger Waters himself for Pink Floyd::

Twin towns – sister cities
Aprilia is twinned with:

  Mostardas, Brazil (1996)
  Buja, Italy (1997)
  Montorio al Vomano, Italy (2000)
  Sciacca, Italy (2003)
  Ben Arous, Tunisia (2003)
  Tulcea, Romania (2003)
  Cingoli, Italy (2004)

References

External links

Cities and towns in Lazio
Populated places established in 1936
1936 establishments in Italy
Italian fascist architecture